Eugene Tapin House is a historic house at 215 Lebanon Hill Road in Southbridge, Massachusetts.  The large Tudor Revival house was built in 1929, at a time when rural portions of Southbridge were gradually becoming suburbanized.  It is one a few high style Tudor homes in the city.  It was built by F.X. LaLiberte to a design by LaLiberte's son Oswald, for the latter's sister and her husband, Camille and Eugene Tapin.  Camille worked in her father's business; Eugene was a music teacher and church organist.  The house was listed on the National Register of Historic Places in 1989.

See also
National Register of Historic Places listings in Southbridge, Massachusetts
National Register of Historic Places listings in Worcester County, Massachusetts

References

Houses completed in 1929
Houses in Southbridge, Massachusetts
National Register of Historic Places in Southbridge, Massachusetts
Houses on the National Register of Historic Places in Worcester County, Massachusetts